The Anatomical Society (AS), previously known as the Anatomical Society of Great Britain and Ireland or ASGBI was founded in London in 1887 to "promote, develop and advance research and education in all aspects of anatomical science".

The society organises scientific meetings, publishes the Journal of Anatomy and Aging Cell and makes annual awards of PhD studentships, grants and prizes.

The society was suggested in early 1887 by Charles Barrett Lockwood, a surgeon and anatomist at St Bartholomew's Hospital, London and the first meeting was held on 6 May 1887. Lockwood was elected as Secretary and Sir George Murray Humphry, Professor of Anatomy and the first Professor of Surgery at Cambridge University, as first President of the society. Two resolutions were adopted: “That an Anatomical Society be founded, and that it be called the Anatomical Society of Great Britain and Ireland” and “That the scope and object of the Society be the Anatomy, Embryology and Histology of Man and of Animals in so far as they throw light upon the structure of Man”.

In 2010 the name of the society was changed to "The Anatomical Society"

Presidents
The presidents of the Anatomical Society:

References

External link 
 Official website of The Anatomical Society (AS)

Learned societies of the United Kingdom
Professional associations based in the United Kingdom
Clubs and societies in the United Kingdom
Organizations established in 1887
1887 establishments in the United Kingdom
Medical and health organisations based in the United Kingdom